Kosco may refer to:

 Kosco Glacier, a glacier flowing from the Anderson Heights vicinity of the Bush Mountains to the Ross Ice Shelf of Antarctica
 Kosco Peak, a rock peak in the Edson Hills, Ellsworth Mountains in Antarctica

People
 Andy Kosco, American baseball player
 John Kosco, front man of the band Dropbox
 Louis F. Kosco, American politician
 Kosco, a graffiti artist featured in the documentary film Style Wars

See also 
 Bart Kosko, academic
 Cosco
 Costco